Carlos Antonio Romero Deschamps (born 17 January 1944) is a Mexican politician affiliated with the PRI. He served as Senator of the LXII Legislature of the Mexican Congress. He also served as Deputy during three Legislatures (1979–1982, 1991–1994, 2000–2003) and as Senator from 1994 to 2000.

Romero Deschamps was included in a list of the "10 most corrupt Mexicans" published by Forbes in 2013.

Allegations of Corruption
Despite Deschamps claims to be on a modest trade union monthly salary of $1,864, he has long been suspected of using his influence as the most powerful Pemex Sindicato de Trabajadores Petroleros de la República Mexicana union leader and one of the most notorious PRI members for personal enrichment, either through embezzlement or peddling.  This salary, although above the Mexican average, cannot account for his opulent and lavish lifestyle.  His daughter routinely displays online publicly her world travels on private jets and yachts, and her frequent fine dining.  His son drives a $2 million limited edition Enzo Ferrari, which was a gift from Deschamps despite his supposed income.

He owns a home in Cancun worth nearly $1.5 million which he has described as a “cottage”.  In 2011 he allegedly received $21.6 million “aid to the union executive committee” and $15.3 million from dues according to political analyst Denise Dresser.  Despite these allegations he has stated that his “hands are clean,” and is currently under investigation.

Deschamps also holds prominent political connections that have arguably allowed him to maintain his high influential position for so long.  He has had ties with the former ruling party, PRI (Revolutionary Institutional Party,) since 1961. Despite being a Union executive he has also managed to be a PRI senator.

In July 2019, Romero Deschamps was expelled from the union after being charged with corruption. However, internal documents from Pemex revealed in January 2021 that Romero Deschamps continues to work at the oil company although he is no longer a member of the union. He will continue to enjoy lengthy paid vacations until 2024 with a salary of MXN $41,203 (USD $2,100) per month. In 2019 he collected MXN $1,208,843 in salary, bonuses, Christmas bonus, fees, and compensations. He also reported MXN $372,018 from investments and the sale of two vehicles, but he did not report the purchase or ownership of any real estate.

References

Members of the Senate of the Republic (Mexico)
Members of the Chamber of Deputies (Mexico)
Mexican people of French descent
1944 births
Living people
Institutional Revolutionary Party politicians
Pemex
People from Tampico, Tamaulipas
20th-century Mexican politicians
21st-century Mexican politicians
Politicians from Tamaulipas